The Kerala Catholic Youth Movement (KCYM) is an organization for the Catholic youth from three rites (Latin Church, Syro-Malabar Church and Syro-Malankara Church) of Christian community of Kerala in India. The patron saint of Kerala Catholic Youth Movement is St. Thomas More.

KCYM is the official state and regional organization under the auspices of the KCBC Kerala Catholic Bishops' Council. It is affiliated to the National Youth Body the "Indian Catholic Youth Movement" (ICYM). It consists of youngsters between the age group of 15– 35 years who subscribe to Catholic values and principles, but beneficiaries include the youth of other religions. The main aim of KCYM is "The Integral Development of The Catholic Youth and The Total Liberation of Human Society in accordance with the Christian values". It is to coordinate and empower the human potentials of youth based on the Gospel values, to make them effective agents of change in the socio-religious-political-economic and cultural reality of India, especially of Kerala through National integration. It also aims at making the youth committed to the serving mission of the Church to the least, last and the lost.

KCYM is a federation of 32 diocesan youth movements of Kerala. Each affiliated diocesan movement has equal rights in the federation. Youth between the age of 15 – 35 are eligible for membership. Each diocese has its own structure in the Parish, Forane and Diocesan level.

Today, KCYM has a membership strength of 342,034 young people making it one of the influential organizations in the region.

Office Bearers
2022 Shijo Mathew Edayadil [President], Bichu Kurian Thomas [General secretary] 
2021 Edward Raju [President], Shijo Mathew Edayadil [General Secretary]
2020 Bijo P. Babu [President], Christy Chackalackal [General Secretary]
2019 Cyriac Chazhikadan [President], Bijo P. Babu [General Secretary]
2018 Immanuel Michael [President), Ebin Kanivayalil( General Secretary)
2017 Pradeep Mathew Nallila [President] Paul Jose Padamattummal[General Secretary]
2016 Sijo Dominic [President] Vincent Mannithottam [General Secretary]
2015 Shine Antony [President] Sijo Ambatt [General Secretary]
2014 Renny Raj [President] Lorence PF [General Secretary]
2013 Shijo Mathew [President] Renny Raj [General Secretary]
2012 Sony Pavelil [President] Cyriac Chazhikadan [General Secretary]
2011 [President], [General Secretary]
2010 [President], [General Secretary]
2009 [President], [General Secretary]
2008 [President], [General Secretary]
2007 [President], [General Secretary]
2006 [President], [General Secretary]
2005 [President], [General Secretary]
2004 [President], [General Secretary]
2003 [President], [General Secretary]
2002 [President], [General Secretary]
2001 [President], [General Secretary]
2000 [President], [General Secretary]
1999 [President], [General Secretary]
1998 [President], [General Secretary]
1997 [President], [General Secretary]
1996 [President], [General Secretary]
1995 [President], [General Secretary]
1994 Vakkachan George[President],Regi Mathew[General Secretary]
1993 [President], [General Secretary]
1992 [President], [General Secretary]
1991 [President], [General Secretary]
1990 [President], [General Secretary]
1989 [President], [General Secretary]
1988 [President], [General Secretary]
1987 [President], [General Secretary]
1986 [President], [General Secretary]
1985 [President], [General Secretary]
1984 [President], [General Secretary]
1983 [President], [General Secretary]
1982 [President], [General Secretary]
1981 [President], [General Secretary]
1980 [President], [General Secretary]
1979 [President], [General Secretary]
1978 Adv.Antony M. Ambat [President], Adv. Joy Abraham [General Secretary]

Aim of KCYM
The Integral Development of the Catholic Youth and the Total Liberation of Human Society in accordance with the Christian values

KCYM Anthem 
The Integral Development of the Catholic Youth and the Total Liberation of Human Society in accordance with the Christian values

KCYM Flag and Emblem 
KCYM have a ‘common flag’ with tricolor 3 stripes red, white and yellow in order of top to bottom . White stripe is illustrated with the red emblem of K.C.Y.M in the center. The word ‘KCYM’ is printed in white stripe before the emblem.
Red
Area covered : 1/3rd of the flag
Symbolization : Symbolizing the martyr ship of our savior Jesus Christ, saint and noble men. Inspiration to sacrifice our life for protecting truth, justices and faith.
White
Area covered : 1/3rd of the flag
Symbolization : Nobility, Innocuous and purity
Yellow
Area covered : 1/3rd of the flag
Symbolization : Faith and Christian suffering

Patron saint
The patron of KCYM is St. Thomas More, who lived with the principle 'Rejoice in the Lord'. "The King's good servant, but God's first." More was beatified in 1886 and canonized by the Catholic Church as a saint by Pope Pius XI in 1935.

St. Thomas More, who lived with the principal ‘Rejoice in the lord’, is the heavenly patron of KCYM. Later on Thomas More, who was popularly known as the patron of advocates, was also declared as the patron of politicians. Thomas More was born in Milk Street, London on February 7, 1478 as the son of Sir John More, a well-known judge. Thomas More completed his schooling in St. Anthony's School in London. As a youth he served as a page in the household of Archbishop Morton. More went on to study at Oxford under Thomas Linacre and William Grocyn. During his studies, he wrote comedies and learnt Greek and Latin literature. One of his first works was an English translation of a Latin biography of the Italian humanist Pico della Mirandola. In 1494 More returned to London to study law. He was admitted to Lincoln's Inn in 1496 and in 1501 he became a barrister. While at Lincoln's Inn, he determined to become a monk and subjected himself to the discipline of the Carthusians, living at a nearby monastery and taking part of the monastic life. The prayer, fasting, and penance habits stayed with him for the rest of his life. More's desire for monasticism was finally overcome by his sense of duty to serve his country in the field of politics. He entered Parliament in 1504.
One of More's first acts in Parliament had been to urge a decrease in a proposed appropriation for King Henry VII. In 1510, he was appointed one of the two undersheriffs of London. Serving in this position, he gained a reputation for being impartial, and a patron to the poor. In 1511, More's first wife died in childbirth. More was soon married again, to Dame Alice. In the following year, More attracted the attention of King Henry VIII. In 1515 he accompanied a delegation to Flanders to help clear disputes about the wool trade. Utopia opens with a reference to this very delegation. More was also instrumental in quelling a 1517 London uprising against foreigners, portrayed in the play Sir Thomas More, possibly by Shakespeare. More accompanied the King and court to the Field of the Cloth of Gold. In 1518 he became a member of the Privy Council, and was knighted in 1521.
More helped Henry VIII in writing his Defence of the Seven Sacraments, a repudiation of Luther, and wrote an answer to Luther's reply under a pseudonym. More had garnered Henry's favor, and was made Speaker of the House of Commons in 1523 and Chancellor of the Duchy of Lancaster in 1525.
In the year 1527, More refused to endorse King Henry VIII's plan to divorce Katherine of Aragón. Nevertheless, after the fall of Thomas Wolsey in 1529, More became Lord Chancellor, the first layman yet to hold the post. In the year 1531, the King discarded himself from the Pope’s rule and declared himself the supreme authority of Catholic Church in England. In 1532, More resigned following his disapproval of Henry's stance toward the church. He refused to attend the coronation of Anne Boleyn in June 1533, a matter which did not escape the King's notice.
In 1534 More was one of the person accused of complicity with Elizabeth Barton, the nun of Kent who opposed Henry's break with Rome. In April, 1534, More refused to swear to the Act of Succession and the Oath of Supremacy, and was committed to the Tower of London on April 17.
More was found guilty of treason and was beheaded alongside Bishop Fisher on July 6, 1535. More's final words on the scaffold were: "The King's good servant, but God's First." More was beatified in 1886 and canonized by the Catholic Church as a saint by Pope Pius XI in 1935.

Directors
2019 – Rev. Fr. Stephen Thomas Chalakkara
2013–2018 – Rev. Fr. Mathew Jacob Thiruvalil OIC
2012–2012 – Rev. Fr. Jaison Kollanoor 
2010–2010 – Rev. Fr. Sebastian Puthen
1978 – Fr. Thomas More CMI

Activities 2015–2016 
Sep 2015: Haritha Yuva Sangamam, Rashrta Sevak Campaign 
Oct 2015: 23 Koithu – Nurturing the Pokkali Fields, Oct 24 Yuvajagaran One Day Hunger Strike against Medical Termination of Pregnancy (MTP) Act 
Nov 2015: 13, 14, 15 Laudato Si Nature Camp, Kakkayam
Dec 2015: 11, 12, 13 Utsav 2015 – Kerala State Catholic Youth Festival at Thalassery 
Jan 2016: KCYM State Senate at Thrissur

Dioceses

Alappuzha 
Bathery 
Changanacherry 
Ernakulam-Angamaly
Idukki 
Irinjalakkuda 
Kanjirappally 
Kannur 
Kochi 
Kothamangalam 
Quilon 
Kottappuram 

Kottayam 
Kozhikode 
Mananthavady 
Mavelikkara 
Muvattupuzha 
Neyyattinkara
Palai 
Palaghat 
Pathanamthitta 
Punalur

Sulthanpett 
Tellichery 
Thamarassery 
Thiruvalla 
Thrissur 
Trivandrum Latin 
Trivandrum Malankara 
Verapoly 
Vijayapuram
Parassala

References

  3. എന്താണ് കെസിവൈഎം ?
4.  KCYM Velur

External links
KCYM ST. LAWRENCE EDAKOCHI
YUVADEEPTHI KCYM KANJIRAPALLY
KCYM Ellakkal, Idukki Diocese
 
 KCYM THRISSUR
 Yuvadeepthi KCYM Kothamangalam Diocese
 KCYM  Kuravilangad Unit- Palai Diocese
 KCYM Palai

 
  

Catholic youth organizations
Youth organisations based in India
Christian organisations based in India
Organisations based in Kochi
Christian organizations established in 1978
1978 establishments in Kerala